The Colorados Archipelago (also called Archipiélago de Santa Isabel and Archipiélago de Guaniguanico) is a chain of isles and cays on Cuba's north-western coast.

The sea surrounding the islands is used mainly for fishing, with commercial captures of lobster, sponge, oysters, red snapper and tuna. Tourism is also developed on cays such as Cayo Levisa, where white sand beaches, as well as snorkeling and diving sites attract tourists.

Geography
Colorados Archipelago is developed on a reef barrier located off the northern coast of the Pinar del Río Province, facing the Gulf of Mexico, between the Honda Bay (north of the homonymous Bahia Honda community) and Cape San Antonio on the Guanahacabibes Peninsula.

The sea surrounding the islands is open to the north, while to the south it is bordered by bays and estuaries such as San Felipe, Honda, Limones, Nombre de Dios, Santa Lucía, Playuelas, Verracos, Tortuga, Catalanes and La Mulata. A navigable corridor exists between the reef barrier and the coast.

Table of Islands

1) The Islands area and population data retrieved following 2012 census.

See also
 Geography of Cuba
 Antilles

References

Geography of Pinar del Río Province
Islands of Cuba